Slater's desert skink (Liopholis slateri), also known commonly as the Centralian Floodplains desert-skink, Slater's egernia, and Slater's skink, is a species of lizard in the family Scincidae. The species is endemic to Australia. There are two recognized subspecies.

Etymology
The specific name, slateri, is in honour of Australian herpetologist Kenneth R. Slater.

Geographic range
L. slateri is found in Northern Territory and Southern Australia in central Australia.

Habitat
The preferred natural habitats of L. slateri are forest and shrubland.

Reproduction
L. slateri is viviparous.

Subspecies
Two subspecies are recognized as being valid including the nominotypical subspecies.
Liopholis slateri slateri  – southern Northern Territory
Liopholis slateri virgata  – northern South Australia

Nota bene: A trinomial authority in parentheses indicates that the subspecies was originally described in a genus other than Liopholis.

References

Further reading
Cogger HG (2014). Reptiles and Amphibians of Australia, Seventh Edition. Clayton, Victoria, Australia: CSIRO Publishing. xxx + 1,033 pp. .
Gardner MG, Hugall AF, Donnellan SC, Hutchinson MN, Foster R (2008). "Molecular systematics of social skinks: phylogeny and taxonomy of the Egernia group (Reptilia: Scincidae)". Zoological Journal of the Linnean Society 154 (4): 781–794. (Liopholis slateri, new combination).
Pavey CR, Burwell CJ, Nano CEM (2010). "Foraging Ecology and Habitat Use of Slater's Skink (Egernia slateri): An Endangered Australian Desert Lizard". Journal of Herpetology 44 (4): 563–571.
Storr GM (1968). "Revision of the Egernia whitei species-group (Lacertilia: Scincidae)". Journal of the Royal Society of Western Australia 51 (2): 51–62. (Egernia slateri, new species; E. s. slateri, new subspecies; E. s. virgata, new subspecies).
Wilson S, Swan G (2013). A Complete Guide to Reptiles of Australia, Fourth Edition. Sydney: New Holland Publishers. 522 pp. . (Liopholis slateri, p. 332).

Skinks of Australia
Liopholis
Reptiles described in 1968
Taxa named by Glen Milton Storr